Michael Carberry is an Australian former professional rugby league footballer who played in the 1980s and 1990s.  Carberry played for Illawarra and South Sydney in the NSWRL competition.

Playing career
Carberry made his first grade debut for South Sydney against St George in Round 1 1980 at Kogarah Oval.  Carberry played with Souths for 5 seasons before departing the club at the end of 1984.

In 1985, Carberry signed with Illawarra and played with the club for a total of 6 seasons, 3 of which ended with the club finishing last and claiming the wooden spoon in 1985, 1986 and 1989.

Carberry retired at the end of the 1990 season.

Post playing
In 2006, Carberry was named in Illawarra's "Team of Steel" celebrating 25 years since the team's creation and featuring the best players to have played for the club.

References

1961 births
Living people
South Sydney Rabbitohs players
Illawarra Steelers players
Australian rugby league players
Rugby league locks
Rugby league second-rows
Place of birth missing (living people)